Pulicaria is a genus of flowering plant in the sunflower family, native to Europe, Asia, and Africa. In North America Pulicaria is known by the common name false fleabane.

Pulicaria species accepted by the Plants of the World Online as of June 2022:

Pulicaria adenophora 
Pulicaria albida 
Pulicaria alveolosa 
Pulicaria angustifolia 
Pulicaria arabica 
Pulicaria argyrophylla 
Pulicaria armena 
Pulicaria aromatica 
Pulicaria attentuata 
Pulicaria aualites 
Pulicaria aucheri 
Pulicaria auranitica 
Pulicaria aylmeri 
Pulicaria baluchistanica 
Pulicaria boissieri 
Pulicaria burchardii 
Pulicaria canariensis 
Pulicaria carnosa 
Pulicaria chrysantha 
Pulicaria clausonis 
Pulicaria collenettei 
Pulicaria confusa 
Pulicaria diffusa 
Pulicaria dioscorides 
Pulicaria discoidea 
Pulicaria diversifolia 
Pulicaria dumulosa 
Pulicaria dysenterica 
Pulicaria edmondsonii 
Pulicaria elegans 
Pulicaria filaginoides 
Pulicaria foliolosa 
Pulicaria gabrielii 
Pulicaria gamal-eldiniae 
Pulicaria glandulosa 
Pulicaria glaucescens 
Pulicaria glutinosa 
Pulicaria gnaphalodes 
Pulicaria grandidentata 
Pulicaria grantii 
Pulicaria guestii 
Pulicaria hadramautica 
Pulicaria hildebrandtii 
Pulicaria incisa 
Pulicaria insignis 
Pulicaria jaubertii 
Pulicaria kurtziana 
Pulicaria laciniata 
Pulicaria lanata 
Pulicaria lanceifolia 
Pulicaria lhotei 
Pulicaria mauritanica 
Pulicaria microcephala 
Pulicaria migiurtinorum 
Pulicaria monocephala 
Pulicaria mucronifolia 
Pulicaria nivea 
Pulicaria nobilis 
Pulicaria odora 
Pulicaria omanensis 
Pulicaria paludosa 
Pulicaria petiolaris 
Pulicaria pulvinata 
Pulicaria rajputanae 
Pulicaria rauhii 
Pulicaria renschiana 
Pulicaria salviifolia 
Pulicaria samhanensis 
Pulicaria scabra 
Pulicaria schimperi 
Pulicaria sericea 
Pulicaria sicula 
Pulicaria somalensis 
Pulicaria steinbergii 
Pulicaria stephanocarpa 
Pulicaria undulata 
Pulicaria uniseriata 
Pulicaria velutina 
Pulicaria vieraeoides 
Pulicaria volkonskyana 
Pulicaria vulgaris 
Pulicaria wightiana

References

 
Asteraceae genera
Taxonomy articles created by Polbot